Zanganeh (also known as Zangan and Zanjāneh) is a village in Chaybasar-e Sharqi Rural District, in the Central District of Poldasht County, West Azerbaijan Province, Iran. At the 2006 census, its population was 43, in 13 families.

References 

Populated places in Poldasht County